Efrem Smith is an American pastor who is the co-pastor of Midtown Church and co-owner of Influential LLC. Smith has spoken on the subjects of leadership, multi-ethnic issues and development of the Christian community. Smith is considered to be an advocate for urban ministry and reaching out to the marginalized.

Education 
Smith graduated from Saint John's University, Luther Theological Seminary, and a DMin from Fuller Theological Seminary.

Career 
Smith has served as the founding pastor of The Sanctuary Covenant Church and is involved in community foundations as he was formerly the President of the Sanctuary Community Development Corporation in Minneapolis, Minnesota and the superintendent of the Pacific Southwest Conference of the Evangelical Covenant Church. In 1993 Smith was ordained by the National Baptist Convention.  Currently, Smith serves as the President and CEO of World Impact as his full-time ministry and is an itinerant speaker for Forge: Kingdom Building Ministries.

Speaking engagements 
As a motivational speaker with Kingdom Building Ministries, Smith has been a keynote speaker for Together LA,  the Urban Youth Worker's Institute Convention, Falvor Fest, Willow Creek Association Leadership Summit and Exponential Conferences.

Books 
 Raising Up Young Heroes 
 The Hip-Hop Church 
 Jump 
 The Post-Black and Post-White Church

Personal life 
Smith lives in the Bay area with his wife Donecia and two daughters.

References

External links 
 Influence Global - official website
 Midtown Church

American chief executives
American Christian writers
American motivational speakers
St. John's University (New York City) alumni
Luther Seminary alumni
Date of birth missing (living people)
Living people
Year of birth missing (living people)